This list of mills in Oldham, lists textile factories that have existed in the town of Oldham, within Metropolitan Borough of Oldham in Greater Manchester, England.

From the Industrial Revolution until the 20th century, Oldham was a major centre of textile manufacture, particularly cotton spinning. During this period, the valleys of the River Beal, River Irk, River Medlock and their tributaries were dominated by large rectangular brick-built factories, many of which still remain today as warehouses or converted for residential or retail use.

A–E

F–J

K–O

P–T

U–Z

See also
 List of mills in the Metropolitan Borough of Oldham

References

Bibliography

Oldham
Oldham
Buildings and structures in Oldham
History of the textile industry
Industrial Revolution in England
Grade II listed buildings in Greater Manchester
Grade II listed industrial buildings